The 1958–59 Oberliga  was the fourteenth season of the Oberliga, the first tier of the football league system in West Germany. The league operated in five regional divisions, Berlin, North, South, Southwest and West. The five league champions and the runners-up from the west, south, southwest and north then entered the 1959 German football championship which was won by Eintracht Frankfurt. It was Frankfurt's sole national championship win. The 1959 final was one of only two post Second World War finals to go into extra time, the other having been in 1949.

A similar-named league, the DDR-Oberliga, existed in East Germany, set at the first tier of the East German football league system. The 1959 DDR-Oberliga was won by SC Wismut Karl-Marx-Stadt.

Oberliga Nord
The 1958–59 season saw two new clubs in the league, ASV Bergedorf 85 and VfV Hildesheim, both promoted from the Amateurliga. The league's top scorer was Uwe Seeler of Hamburger SV with 29 goals, the highest total for any scorer in the five Oberligas in 1958–59.

Oberliga Berlin
The  1958–59 season saw two new clubs in the league, BFC Südring and Rapide Wedding, both promoted from the Amateurliga Berlin. The league's top scorer was Reinhard Knöfel of Spandauer SV with 23 goals.

Oberliga West
The 1958–59 season saw two new clubs in the league, STV Horst-Emscher and Borussia München-Gladbach, both promoted from the 2. Oberliga West. The league's top scorer was Gerhard Clement of Westfalia Herne with 28 goals.

Oberliga Südwest
The  1958–59 season saw two new clubs in the league, Sportfreunde Saarbrücken and SpVgg Weisenau, both promoted from the 2. Oberliga Südwest. The league's top scorers were Rudolf Bast (FV Speyer) and Helmut Kapitulski (FK Pirmasens) with 25 goals each.

Oberliga Süd
The  1958–59 season saw two new clubs in the league, TSG Ulm 1846 and SV Waldhof Mannheim, both promoted from the 2. Oberliga Süd. The league's top scorer was Ernst-Otto Meyer of VfR Mannheim with 27 goals, a record third time finishing as the league's top scorer.

German championship

The 1959 German football championship was contested by the nine qualified Oberliga teams and won by Eintracht Frankfurt, defeating Kickers Offenbach in the final. The runners-up of the Oberliga Nord and Südwest played a pre-qualifying match. The remaining eight clubs then played a home-and-away round in two groups of four. The two group winners then advanced to the final.

Qualifying

|}

Group 1

Group 2

Final

|}

References

Sources
 30 Jahre Bundesliga  30th anniversary special, publisher: kicker Sportmagazin, published: 1993
 kicker-Almanach 1990  Yearbook of German football, publisher: kicker Sportmagazin, published: 1989, 
 DSFS Liga-Chronik seit 1945  publisher: DSFS, published: 2005
 100 Jahre Süddeutscher Fußball-Verband  100 Years of the Southern German Football Federation, publisher: SFV, published: 1997

External links
 The Oberligas on Fussballdaten.de 

1958-59
1
Ger